Events from the year 1649 in France

Incumbents
 Monarch – Louis XIV
Regent: Anne of Austria

Events
11 March – signing of the Peace of Rueil

Births
22 February – Bon Boullogne, painter (died 1717)
5 September – Louise de Kérouaille, Duchess of Portsmouth, mistress of Charles II of England (died 1734)

Deaths

24 April – Gaston Jean Baptiste de Renty, aristocrat and philanthropist (born 1611)
30 June – Simon Vouet, painter and draftsman (born 1590)
30 October – Honoré d'Albert, duke (born 1581)
Full date missing
Jean Sirmond, poet and historiographer (born 1589)
Christophe Justel, scholar (born 1580)
François Véron, Jesuit controversialist (born c.1575)

See also

References

1640s in France